KVRZ (88.9 FM) was a radio station licensed to serve Libby, Montana. The station's license was held by the Troy Fine Arts Council and was managed by the Libby Community Radio Club.

The licensee surrendered the station's license to the Federal Communications Commission on September 6, 2019; the FCC cancelled KVRZ's license that day.

References

External links

VRZ
Country radio stations in the United States
Radio stations established in 2009
2009 establishments in Montana
Lincoln County, Montana
Defunct radio stations in the United States
Radio stations disestablished in 2019
2019 disestablishments in Montana
Defunct community radio stations in the United States
VRZ